Fyteies is a village and a former municipality in Aetolia-Acarnania, West Greece, Greece. It is situated on a hill and parts of it are overlooking the lake Ozeros. Since the 2011 local government reform it is part of the municipality Xiromero (Astakos area) of which it is a municipal unit, though traditionally the schooling of locals was grouped with other villages lying to the north (e.g. Katouna). The municipal unit has an area of 96.295 km2. Population 2,154 (2011).

A few kilometres away is located the monastery of Ligovitsi.

External links
Municipality of Fyteies

References

Populated places in Aetolia-Acarnania